is a Japanese comedy manga series written and illustrated by matoba. It was serialized in Square Enix's Monthly Shōnen Gangan magazine from July 2015 to May 2020, with its chapters collected into twelve tankōbon volumes. The series is licensed by Yen Press. An anime television series adaptation by Liden Films aired from October to December 2018.

Synopsis
Mullin works for Her Highness, Lady Beelzebub, and is something you could call being her secretary. Their working place is Hell, so Lady Beelzebub has to be fierce and strong at all times. However, Mullin is surprised when he finds out that his boss is obsessed with all things fluffy and sweet. Her room is full of fluffy little creatures called Gossamer and she loves to eat sweets.

In his quest to make sure Beelzebub does all of her work and perhaps doesn't sleep naked, Mullin has to cope with his burgeoning crush on his boss and the oddities of the other demons around her, like Azazel and his refusal to talk or Belphagor and her nervous bladder. But even if the job is harder than he expected in some strange ways, Mullin wouldn't trade it for anything…especially because little miss Beelzebub may be starting to like him back.

Characters

A young girl with long blond hair and blue eyes. Beelzebub is a former Seraph and the current ruler of Pandemonium following the unexplained disappearance of Satan. While most demons look up to her for her skills as a capable and intelligent ruler, in private she is a ditzy airhead who rules only because it is her job and loves anything fluffy, in fact her lifelong dream is to become one big ball of fluff. She enjoys teasing her Head Attendant, Mullin, and frequently embarrasses him for her own amusement. She falls in love with him after an incident where he protected her from thugs made her heart race, but as she has had no experience with men she as yet does not understand what her feelings are.

Mullin is young male demon with light blue-purple hair and tiny green eyes, he is Beelzebub's Head Attendant and prefers all work to run smoothly and efficiently. He has some tsundere characteristics with other demons claiming he has the "pure heart of a maiden." He is easily embarrassed and will blush whenever he is exposed to Beelzebub's naked body or anything to do with sex. He is often frustrated by Beelzebub's behavior and while he respects her leadership skills he is more than willing to scold her ditzy airheaded behavior. He is strongly attracted to her and often cannot handle how cute she is. He is highly protective of her and has at least some ability to fight as he quickly dealt with two thugs harassing Beelzebub when she was lost in the city.

A young female demon with pink hair and red eyes, she is the former Principality of Heaven. She suffers from severe social anxiety and is scared of almost everybody, except for Beelzebub whom she always runs to and hides behind. Her anxiety means she shakes from fear almost constantly and also has a nervous bladder that causes her to urinate when she is really frightened, meaning she dashes to the bathroom several times a minute. She appears to have a crush on Azazel as she is extra nervous around him, upset when she thought he was mad at her and happily accepted a bag of cookies from Mullin after learning Azazel baked them.

A tall and muscular demon with a serious demeanor, silver hair, and brown eyes who used to be a Cherub. Despite his serious appearance, he is actually extremely kind and friendly. He almost never speaks out loud, preferring to communicate with messages written on display boards and can only be heard talking in his head. He secretly loves cute things like puppies and kittens and collects stuffed toys he keeps in his room, especially teddy bears. The only meal he will eat from the castle's canteen is teddy bear pancakes. He is skilled enough at sewing that he can make his own stuffed animals, which he frequently is asked to do by Beelzebub, and is also able to bake his own cookies. He has a crush on Belphegor and hates that his appearance frightens her and has tried several methods of making himself seem less scary. 

A tall and strict female demon with brown eyes and short purple hair except for two long strands that almost reach the floor. She is Astaroth's assistant and spends most of her time chasing him down and forcing him to return to work. Despite her calm and collected appearance she is actually an open sadist, frequently punishing Astaroth violently or threatening to shoot him with her twin pistols, especially when he draws attention to her flat chest. Her position in Pandemonium's finance department allows her to maintain a secret stash of money to repair any damages caused by her violent methods of forcing Astaroth to actually do his job. Despite her violence she also enjoys cute things similar to Azazel, though unlike Azazel she prefers to keep her hobby a secret. She has a secret crush on Astaroth and becomes embarrassed whenever he says anything nice to her.

A male former Angel with blond hair and gold eyes who sometimes uses fake angel wings to impress women. He is now Pandemonium's Minister of Finance, in control of all the money and department budgets, though he has been known to waste or misspend the budgets recklessly. He chose to fall from Heaven shortly after Beelzebub did due to his crush on her and often tries to communicate his feelings, though his methods make him come across as a stalker. He was surprised that Beelzebub seemed to like Mullin more than himself as he considers Mullin boring and unimpressive. He likes to refer to himself as Beelzebub's older brother, though they are not related. 

A female glasses-wearing demon with long blue hair and green eyes who works in Pandemonium's Justice Department. While working she is very professional and, according to Mullin, very cool; but, in secret, she has a fetish for boys in Elementary School, though she only ever watches them from a distance. Her fetish means she considers grown men to be unappealing and the only way she can stand talking with them is by using her powerful imagination, a power she calls Wings of Imagination, to picture all grown men in their young boy forms. She dislikes Astaroth because of his insincere, promiscuous personality, much preferring his fragile, needy young boy form she sees in her imagination. She appears to have a more substantial crush on Dantalion due to his extremely youthful appearance. 

A youthful looking male demon with blue hair, blue eyes and blue rabbit ears. He is the librarian of Pandemonium's library who has both Bibliomania and Bibliophilia. His favorite activity is reading books at night, meaning he often falls asleep at his desk, whilst talking to people and even when standing up. He possesses an ability to determine exactly what book a person would most want to read, correctly guessing Mullin's favorite author after only knowing him for a few seconds. He is friends with Azazel and uses Molech as a stepladder to reach high shelves. Though he refers to Molech as "Senpai" he is usually the one ordering Molech around. He claims to have read every book within the library, of which there are over 700 million. Based on the amount of time it would take to read so many books Mullin calculates that the youthful looking Dantalion may actually be one of the oldest demons in Pandemonium. 

An extremely energetic, overeager and loud male demon with brown hair, green eyes and glasses. He is one of the oldest demons in Pandemonium making him almost as important as Beelzebub, however, unlike Beelzebub he delegates all his work to his subordinates so he can focus on his real passion, doing whatever Dantalion tells him to. 

A tall male demon with orange hair and eyes. He is the former Principality of the Garden of Eden who guarded the Forbidden fruit. He is now Beelzebub's personal chef and is proud of this fact, even being moved to tears when Beelzebub asked for a lesson in cooking, thinking she wanted to learn so she wouldn't need him anymore. He is skilled enough that he can cook an entire meal in 3 seconds, moving at such high speeds his clothes are torn off. 

A male former Thrones Demon with styled purple hair, a hat decorated with a ribbon, a military jacket around his shoulders and a wide collared shirt left unbuttoned. Despite being a male demon he is quite feminine and prefers his nickname, Lady Ad, instead of his full name. He adores anything pretty and is slightly narcissistic as he blushed after seeing his own reflection. He works for Pandemonium's Apparel and Design Department in charge of everything art related and is responsible for Beelzebub's personal clothing and ceremonial regalia. 

A female demon with the head of a lion, ribbon decorations woven into her hair and wearing a black dress under a short sleeved white lab coat. She is the Head doctor of Pandemonium's infirmary. 

A Succubus with long light blue hair tied with a pink bow, darker blue horns and a white dress with military epaulette's on the shoulders. She works as a Section Chief in Pandemonium's Seduction Department and works closely with Adrammelech. 
Narrator

Media

Manga
Written and illustrated by matoba, As Miss Beelzebub Likes was serialized in Square Enix's shōnen manga magazine Monthly Shōnen Gangan from July 10, 2015, to May 12, 2020. Square Enix collected its chapters in twelve tankōbon volumes, released from March 12, 2016, to July 10, 2020.

English manga publisher Yen Press announced during their panel at Sakura-Con on April 15, 2017 that they had licensed the series.

Volume list

Anime

An anime television series adaptation was announced in the May 2018 issue of Monthly Shōnen Gangan on April 12, 2018. The series is directed by Hiraku Kaneko and written by Yoriko Tomita, with animation by studio Liden Films. Etsuko Sumimoto is the character designer, while Satoshi Motoyama is the sound director. Kanon Wakeshima and naotyu- composed the series' music. The series aired from October 11 to December 27, 2018 on ABC and other channels. The opening theme is  performed by Sangatsu no Phantasia, while the ending theme is a character song titled  and performed by Saori Ōnishi, Misaki Kuno, and Ai Kakuma. Crunchyroll streamed the series and it ran for 12 episodes.

Notes

References

External links
  
  
 

Anime series based on manga
Comedy anime and manga
Crunchyroll anime
Discotek Media
Gangan Comics manga
Liden Films
Shōnen manga
Square Enix franchises
Supernatural anime and manga
Yen Press titles